Montreal Lake may refer to:

one of two lakes with that name in Manitoba
Montreal Lake (Ontario)
Montreal Lake (Saskatchewan)
Montreal Lake, Saskatchewan a village on Montreal Lake (Saskatchewan)